Yousef Hassan (born 24 May 1996) is a Qatari footballer. He currently plays for Al-Gharafa and the Qatar national football team.

Career
Hassan was loaned to Belgian club Eupen from Al-Gharafa during the winter transfer window in January 2015.

Honours

Club
Al-Gharafa
 Qatari Stars Cup: 2017–2018, 2018–2019

International
Qatar
 2019 AFC Asian Cup
 2014 AFC U-19 Championship

External links

References

Qatari footballers
1996 births
Living people
Al-Gharafa SC players
K.A.S. Eupen players
Aspire Academy (Qatar) players
Qatar Stars League players
Qatari expatriate footballers
Expatriate footballers in Spain
Qatari expatriate sportspeople in Spain
Expatriate footballers in Belgium
Qatari expatriate sportspeople in Belgium
2019 AFC Asian Cup players
2021 CONCACAF Gold Cup players
Association football goalkeepers
AFC Asian Cup-winning players
Qatar international footballers
Qatar youth international footballers
Qatar under-20 international footballers
2022 FIFA World Cup players